Prince Ahmed Al-Zubair al-Senussi, also known as Zubeir Ahmed El-Sharif, (born 1934) is a Libyan member of the Senussi house and a member of the National Transitional Council representing political prisoners.

Biography 

He is a great-nephew of Idris of Libya, the only king of Libya, and was named after his grandfather Ahmed Sharif as-Senussi.  Ahmed al-Senussi graduated from the Military Academy of Iraq in 1958. In 1961 he married his wife Fatilah, since deceased.

In 1970, he began planning to overthrow Muammar Gaddafi one year after Gaddafi had seized power in a military coup. Along with his brother and other conspirators, he sought to replace the Gaddafi government and allegedly give people a chance to choose between a monarchy or a constitutional republic. He was arrested and sentenced to death; however, in 1988 his sentence was commuted to an additional 13 years incarceration, and his family was allowed to visit him. He stayed in solitary confinement for the first nine years of his sentence and was allegedly frequently tortured. He claims that the torture included frequent beatings with sticks, being strung up by his hands and legs, nearly drowned, and having his feet broken. After being let out of solitary confinement, he shared a cell with numerous other prisoners, including Omar El-Hariri. After being transferred to Abu Salim prison in 1984, he learned that his wife had died while he was in captivity. He received a pardon on the 32nd anniversary of Gaddafi taking power, and received US$ 107,300 (131,000 Libyan dinars) and a monthly pension of US$ 314.62 (400 Libyan dinars). He was held as a political prisoner for 31 years until his release in 2001, making him the longest incarcerated prisoner in modern Libyan history.

On 27 October 2011, the European Parliament chose him with four other Arab people to win Sakharov Prize for Freedom of Thought in 2011. 

On 6 March 2012, Ahmed al-Senussi was announced as the leader of the self-declared Cyrenaica Transitional Council.

Ancestry

References

1934 births
Living people
Ahmed al-Senussi
People of the First Libyan Civil War
Libyan Muslims
Prisoners sentenced to death by Libya
Libyan prisoners sentenced to death
Libyan torture victims
Government ministers of Libya
Members of the National Transitional Council
Libyan people of Algerian descent
Libyan people of Arab descent
Sakharov Prize laureates
20th-century  Libyan people